The 2020–21 season was Alanyaspor's 73rd season in existence and the club's fifth consecutive season in the top flight of Turkish football. In addition to the domestic league, Alanyaspor participated in this season's editions of the Turkish Cup and the UEFA Europa League. The season covered the period from July 2020 to 30 June 2021.

Players

First-team squad

Out on loan

Pre-season and friendlies

Competitions

Overview

Süper Lig

League table

Results summary

Results by round

Matches

Turkish Cup

UEFA Europa League

References

External links

Alanyaspor seasons
Alanyaspor
Alanyaspor